This is a list of recurring characters in the British teen drama Skins. It does not include the main characters of the show, who can be found at List of Skins characters.

Supporting characters

First generation
Effy Stonem (Kaya Scodelario): Effy is Tony's sister, who appears sporadically in the first two series, not speaking until her first central episode right before passing out at a party. She also contributes to sorting out the relationship problems between Tony, Michelle, Sid and Cassie. She becomes the lead character in the next generation.
Posh Kenneth (Daniel Kaluuya): Posh Kenneth hangs around with members of the Skins gang on occasion. One of his chief characteristics is his code-switching between British English sociolects. In the series 1 finale, he displays a romantic interest in Jal. In the first episode of the second season he is seen rapping at a party that the gang attends. On the official website, he states that he wishes to become a psychiatrist or a politician, and that his heroes are Sigmund Freud and Trevor McDonald.
Abigail Stock (Georgina Moffat): Abigail is a posh choir girl and stereotypical rah who is friendly with Tony, and with whom he occasionally cheats on Michelle. Her mother works as a doctor at the rehabilitation centre which Cassie frequently visited. She is the sister of Josh. After Tony's accident at the end of Series 1, Abigail pretends to have been his girlfriend before the accident, and tries to continue this when she sees him. After Sid reveals to Tony that he loved Michelle and not Abigail before the accident, the couple part ways.
Josh Stock (Ben Lloyd-Hughes): Josh is Michelle's boyfriend in her central episode. He candidly reveals that he believes his mother (Cassie's psychiatrist) is "psychotic" and that she psychoanalyzes and medicates her children, and claims that he is a "different person" off the drugs. Tony sends Michelle sensitive pictures of Abi from Josh's phone, making her believe he is crazy and dumping him. Josh reappears in "Effy," when he, along with his friend, Spencer give Effy some drugs, and then try and force Tony to have sex with his unconscious sister. After much begging and pleading, Josh allows Tony to walk away with Effy, declaring that "here endeth the lesson." It is later revealed that the drugs Josh gave Effy were actually clean Pharmaceuticals, which Josh most likely stole from his mother's clinic.
Pandora Moon (Lisa Backwell): Pandora appeared in Series 2 when becoming a new student at Effy's school. Effy soon befriends her despite their noticeable differences. Pandora tags along with Effy to sort out the problems between Sid, Cassie, Tony and Michelle. Pandora soon becomes a main character in Series 3 and 4.
Mad Twatter (real name Madison Twatter) (Stephen Walters): Mad Twatter first appeared in Episode 1 of Series 1, when Sid buys marijuana off of him. However, after losing three ounces of the drug to Sid (who doesn't pay), he comes after and threatens Sid. After finally catching up with Sid, along with Jal Fazer, Mad Twatter destroys Jal's priceless clarinet, and beats up her brothers when they go after him. In response, Jal's father and his bodyguards corner him under a bridge and drive him away. His whereabouts are never revealed.
Water Bottle Girl (Danielle Jadelyn): Water Bottle Girl was a girl that went to the same rehabilitation centre as Cassie, and appeared in two episodes of the first series. She was first seen drinking a large bottle of water to make up the weight so she could be discharged from the clinic, but ended up running to the toilet. The two become friends after sneaking out and getting a taxi into town, where she buys chips from the takeaway.
Alan the Taxi Driver (Alan George): Alan is the friendly taxi driver that takes Cassie to the rehabilitation centre, and seems to be the only one that understands her. Cassie seems to think of him as a father figure.
Simon (James Buckley): Simon is Cassie's boyfriend in the Series 1 episode, "Michelle". They both are patients of the rehabilitation centre.
James (Sean Verey): James is a gay cyclist, and Maxxie's love interest since Episode 8 of Series 2. James and Maxxie later become an official couple, and move to London together in the series two finale.
Jake (Angus Harrison): Effy's friend from the Series 2 episode, "Effy".
Scarlett (Sia Berkeley): Michelle's step-sister. Although Michelle thinks of her as a "bitch", her friends (especially Chris) take an instant liking to her and she proves to be useful several times during the trip, providing them with travel and encouraging Michelle to chase after Sid when he is depressed, to which Michelle has a change of heart towards her.

Second generation
Karen McClair (Klariza Clayton): Karen is Freddie's older sister who is desperate to become famous so decides to go on a TV show called "Search for a Sexxbomb" but loses when Cook encourages everyone at the local pub to vote against her. It is also revealed that Cook has slept with her. In series 4 she decides to do hairdressing at college, and in the final episode confronts Cook due to his inability to find Freddie.
James Fitch (Redd Smith): James is the younger brother of Katie and Emily. He is rude, foul-mouthed and has an obsession with the female anatomy, even to the point he spies on his sisters when in the shower.
Danny Guillermo (Henry Garrett): Danny is Katie's boyfriend in the third series, who crashes Pandora's party despite Katie telling him not to. They eventually break up and Danny reappears in Katie's episode in series 4, where he has a new girlfriend, Candy who picks a fight with Katie.
Johnny White (Mackenzie Crook): Johnny is the local gangster, dabbling in drugs, gang warfare, and illegal property leasing. After Cook upstages him at his daughter's engagement party, and furthermore after Cook tortures him while incapacitated at a brothel, Johnny vows to seek revenge. However, after being defeated in a chili pepper eating contest with Thomas, he backs off.
DS Blunt (Pauline Quirke): An investigator of the death of Sophia.
Mandy (Karina Minhas): Mandy appears in two episodes in series 4 as a friend of Emily, first in "JJ" where the central character catches them together, and later in the finale, where she is revealed to be a lesbian, causing further tensions between Emily and Naomi.
Arcia (Holly Churches): Arcia is Cook's new sexual partner in the series 4 closer. However, Cook leaves her after Naomi accidentally makes him realise Arcia resembles Effy and as an act of revenge, Arcia informs the police where Cook is, as he has escaped from prison. 
Steve (David Baddiel): A colleague of Jim Stonem, with whom his wife Anthea has an affair.
Martin (James Fleet): Pandora's neighbour who briefly spies on Naomi before she attends Pandora's party and had a relationship with Pandora's mum, Angela, as Effy and Cook find out via DVD.
Lara Lloyd (Georgia Henshaw): Lara is JJ's girlfriend from the latter's central episode onwards, who has a nine-month-old baby called Albert.
Albert Lloyd (played by twins Seth Evans and Nixon Evans): Albert is the nine-month-old son of JJ's girlfriend, Lara.
Sam (Ben Evans): Sam is Katie's new boyfriend. He seems to be a comical yet quirky character who Katie claims to be "Totally Hung". Katie dumps him in her centric episode in series 4.
Dr. John Foster (Hugo Speer): John is Effy's psychiatrist. However he appears to become attracted to Effy and his techniques begin to worry her mother and Freddie. After Freddie approaches John about this, he kills Freddie by beating him to death with a baseball bat. Cook discovers the murder at the end of Series 4 and attacks John, killing him as revealed in series 7.
Sophia Moore (Amberley Gridley): Sophia is the girl who commits suicide at the start of the fourth series. She was intoxicated by MDMA, which was dealt to her by Naomi and Cook. It is also revealed that she had had a brief affair with Naomi, and it is indicated that her infatuation with Naomi and later heartbreak is what results in her suicide.
Matt Moore (Richard Southgate): Matt is Sophia's younger brother. He has a very close bond with his sister and knew about her secrets. He meets up with Emily as they find out the truth behind her death.
Father Babajide  (Steve Toussaint) is the pastor of the church Thomas and his family attend. In the wake of Sophia's death, Thomas feels guilty and turns back to God, during which time Father Babajide gives him guidance.
Andrea Babajide  (Adelayo Adedayo) Andrea is the daughter of the local pastor, Father Babajide. She strikes up a brief friendship-turned-relationship with Thomas when he attends her father's church.

Third generation
Toxic Bob (Huey Morgan) an American who works in a heavy metal music shop of which Rich Hardbeck is a frequent visitor, and reads Heat magazine in secret.
Rider  (Dan Black) plays on the rugby team and is best friends with Nick; they fall out severely in series five, but are friends again in series six. His sexuality is brought into question numerous times because of his obsession with deeming people as homosexuals, and it's further explored in the online webisode(s) and on his social networking accounts. It's highly indicated that he sleeps with Alex during the finale of 'Whore Wars.'
Jemima  (Kelly Brook) Mini's fitness instructor.
Dewi (Dave Hill) is a farm hand at Alo's parents' farm, who half of the time, speaks in gibberish. Alo also claims that Dewi used to be in a Beatles tribute band.
Luke (Joe Cole) is a gangster the group met in Morocco that took a liking to Franky. He was partially responsible for Grace's death. In Franky's episode he returned, and showed that he was a much darker, more complex character, who had anger issues. He was in a short relationship with Franky, but after she realised what he was doing was wrong, she was saved by her father who pushed Luke away, leaving him in an angry rage by himself.

College staff

First generation
Angie (Siwan Morris): Angie is a psychology teacher at the college who has shown an affection for Chris. Although ashamed of the relationship, she sleeps with him multiple times, despite having an estranged fiancé. Both relationships eventually end. She visits Chris in Series 2, Episode 5 and has sex with him, even though he was seeing Jal at the time. She eventually leaves her flat to Chris.
Tom Barkley (Robert Wilfort): Tom is a history teacher at the college who sometimes struggles to empathise with his young students with his view on their lingo, which he frequently attempts to emulate, with cringe-worthy results. He harbours an affection for Angie, which is unrequited.
Harriet Lawes (Victoria Wicks): Head of Roundview College in Series 1, 2 and 3, but is replaced by David in Series 4.
Doug (Giles Thomas): Doug is a biology teacher at the college who is seen in various scenarios, from taking over the school's production of "Osama: The Musical" after Bruce Gelcart was fired to substituting for Angie's Psychology class. He is the only character to star in every series (excluding series 7)
Bruce Gelcart (Shane Richie): Bruce is the college drama teacher, and writer and director of the school production of "Osama: The Musical". He is sacked after Sketch falsely claims that he sexually molested her.
Marnie (Wendy Brierley): Marnie is a lunch lady at the college who believes that Jamie Oliver is a "smartarse blonde fucker" for inciting changes in the school's lunch program.
Josie (Josie Long): Josie is the Careers Advisor at the college. She first appeared in the Unseen Skins, and also appears in Chris's episode in Season 2, and can be seen with the rest of the cast at Chris's funeral in the last episode of Season 2. She appears again in Freddie's episode of Season 3. Josie Long is also a writer for the series.
Claire (Pooky Quesnel): Claire is the constantly swearing music teacher who conducts the orchestra which Jal plays in and forms a romantic and intimate relationship with Doug.

Second generation
Doug (Giles Thomas)
Harriet Lawes (Victoria Wicks)
Kieran MacFoeinaiugh (Ardal O'Hanlon): Kieran is the college's politics teacher, who has long since lost his passion for the job; he repeatedly declares that he hates teaching, and the college has made attempts to send him on a variety of motivational courses. He forms a close friendship with Naomi, which is strained when he attempts to kiss her; after that, he visits her house to apologise and ends up in bed with her mother. Naomi is initially horrified, but ultimately she encourages him to pursue a relationship with her.
Josie (Josie Long): Former Head Of Guidance and Careers Advisor in Series 2, Josie begins teaching English in Series 3. Later in Series 4, during Freddie's episode, T. Love takes her place in Guidance, as he says Josie has had "a small breakdown".
David Blood (Chris Addison): The new Director of Roundview College, replacing Harriet as of the start of series 4.
T. Love (Will Young): Somewhat peculiar student advisor, who has a strange obsession with Michael Jackson.

Third generation
Doug (Giles Thomas) who returns for the fifth and sixth series. Doug is the college's new headmaster in series 6 replacing Blood, Doug resigns and leaves Roundview at the end of the series. His decision to leave marks a symbolic end to the Skins era.
David Blood (Chris Addison): The new Headmaster, Blood is a corrupt and arrogant headmaster. In series 6, Blood leaves Roundview, presumably too grief-stricken about Grace's death.
Alan Precopp (Gordon Kennedy): English Teacher who has been in prison and has tattoos of people he knows.
Coach Pooter (Alistair McGowan): Nick's South African rugby coach, who convinces Nick to stand up for himself.
Josie (Josie Long): Josie returns in series 6, once again as a guidance counsellor, having not appeared in series 5 after her offscreen "mental breakdown" in series 4.

References

 
Lists of minor fictional characters